Charles Scott Madison (born September 12, 1959) is an American former professional baseball third baseman. He played in 71 games over five seasons in Major League Baseball for the Detroit Tigers, Kansas City Royals, and Cincinnati Reds.

Scotti Madison was born and raised in Pensacola, Florida. He attended J. M. Tate High School and played football there under the guidance of his uncle and coach Carl Madison. A graduate of Vanderbilt University in 1981, Madison was quarterback of the school's football team and catcher for the baseball team. In 1979, he played collegiate summer baseball with the Hyannis Mets of the Cape Cod Baseball League and was named a league all-star. He was selected All-Southeastern Conference three times and All-American his senior year, the first baseball player at VU to be named as a first-team All-American. Vanderbilt University inducted Madison into the Vanderbilt Hall of Fame on September 2, 2011.

In 2012, Madison published his first book, Just a Phone Call Away: A Major Journey through the Minor Leagues, which highlights his baseball-playing years and experiences, from Little League to the USA All-Star team (playing in Cuba in 1979) to the pros.

References

External links

 or Baseball Almanac
Vanderbilt University - "Scotti Madison Talks About His Baseball Career"

Living people
1959 births
Detroit Tigers players
Kansas City Royals players
Cincinnati Reds players
Major League Baseball third basemen
Vanderbilt Commodores baseball players
Hyannis Harbor Hawks players
Baseball players from Florida
Orlando Twins players
Visalia Oaks players
San Antonio Dodgers players
Albuquerque Dukes players
Birmingham Barons players
Nashville Sounds players
Omaha Royals players
All-American college baseball players